Dortmund Stadthaus station is an important railway station of the inner city of Dortmund in the German state of North Rhine-Westphalia. It is located in the inner city at the junction of Ruhrallee (B54) and Märkischen Straße, near the Stadthaus, a municipal office building. It is classified by Deutsche Bahn as a category 5 station. The above-ground section of the station is served by Rhine-Ruhr S-Bahn line S 4 and the underground section is served by lines U41, U45, U47 and U49 of the Dortmund Stadtbahn.

Significance 

Line S4 runs in the east-west direction from Unna to Dortmund-Luetgendortmund on above ground tracks through the station. The platforms are accessible by stairs and lifts. The underground section is served by lines U41, U45, U47 and U49, which run in a north-south direction. In addition, bus route 444 operated by the municipal bus company, Dortmunder Stadtwerke (DSW21), stops in front of the station, connecting to Dortmund Hauptbahnhof and the Hohensyburg Casino at Syburg each hour.

History 

The station is on the historic Ruhr line of the Rhenish Railway Company and the Welver–Sterkrade railway of the Royal Westphalian Railway Company, in the immediate vicinity of the abandoned Dortmund Süd (south) station. Trains have stopped here since 26 May 1963. It was originally served by battery electric multiple units of class 515. It was served by Silberling carriages hauled by class 212 locomotives from 1980. Since 3 June 1984 run x-Wagen (“x-cars”,  a type of push–pull train), initially propelled by class 111 locomotives and from 1995 by class 143 locomotives. In December 2011, line S4 was converted to operation by class 422 electric multiple units.

Rail services 

Dortmund Stadthaus station is served by Rhine-Ruhr S-Bahn line S 4 at 20-minute intervals.

It  is also served by lines U41, U45, U47 and U49 of the Dortmund Stadtbahn, all at 10-minute intervals.

References 

Railway stations in Dortmund
S4 (Rhine-Ruhr S-Bahn)
Rhine-Ruhr S-Bahn stations
Dortmund VRR stations
Railway stations in Germany opened in 1963
1963 establishments in West Germany